This is a list of the largest cities and towns located on Danube river.

List

Rivers of Europe